Dampier is an impact crater in the Memnonia quadrangle of Mars. It was named after the town of Dampier, Western Australia, in 2021.

Dampier is south of Burton crater. Karratha crater lies within Dampier. It is likely Noachian in age.

References 

Impact craters on Mars